The Pirate's Daughter is a 1997 mystery novel by Robert Girardi. Paula Friedman of the New York Times felt that Girardi's "rendering of [the pirate island] is lush and commanding, despite the horror it reveals."

References 

1997 American novels
American mystery novels